The Phoenix was an experimental version of the Bristol Aeroplane Company's Pegasus engine, adapted to run on the Diesel cycle. Only a few were built between 1928 and 1932, although samples fitted to a Westland Wapiti held the altitude record for diesel-powered aircraft at 27,453 ft (8,368 m) from 11 May 1934 until World War II. The primary advantage of the Phoenix was better fuel efficiency at cruise, by up to 35%.

Variants
 Phoenix I: Diesel version of the Pegasus IF, 380 hp.
 Phoenix IIM: Medium-supercharged diesel version of Pegasus IM, 470 hp.

Applications
Westland Wapiti

Specifications (Phoenix I)

See also

References

Notes

Bibliography

Gunston, Bill. World Encyclopedia of Aero Engines. Cambridge, England. Patrick Stephens Limited, 1989. 
Lumsden, Alec. British Piston Engines and their Aircraft. Marlborough, Wiltshire: Airlife Publishing, 2003. .

External links
Bristol Phoenix and Westland Wapiti - Flight, May 1934

Aircraft air-cooled radial piston engines
Aircraft radial diesel engines
Phoenix
1920s aircraft piston engines